Guy V of Châtillon, Count of Saint-Pol (d. 1360 in London) was a French nobleman.  He was a member of the House of Châtillon and was the son of Count John of Saint-Pol (d. 1344) and his wife Johanna of Fiennes.

In the Hundred Years' War, he served as a royal commander in the French army.  He fought several battles against the English in Picardy.  He was one of the hostages sent to England under the terms of the Treaty of Brétigny of 1360.  He died of the plague shortly after arriving in London.

Guy was married to Johanna (d. 1392), a daughter of Lord John I of Ligny.  Since they had no children, he was succeeded as Count of Saint-Pol by his sister Mahaut and her husband Guy of Luxembourg-Ligny.

External links 
 Entry at genealogie-mittelalter.de

Guy V
Guy V
14th-century births
1360 deaths
Year of birth unknown
14th-century French people